Sundwarda is a monotypic moth genus of the family Erebidae erected by Charles Swinhoe in 1901. Its only species, Sundwarda dohertyi, was first described by Herbert Druce in 1901. It is found in Malaysia.

References

External links
Original description: Druce, Herbert (1901). "Descriptions of some new species of Heterocera". Annals and Magazine of Natural History. (7) 7 (37): 77.

Calpinae
Monotypic moth genera